The Princeton Tigers represented Princeton University in ECAC women's ice hockey. The Tigers will attempt to win the NCAA tournament for the first time in school history.

Offseason

Recruiting

Regular season

Standings

Schedule

Conference record

Roster

References

Princeton Tigers women's ice hockey seasons
2012–13 NCAA Division I women's hockey season